Marc Innes-Brown is an Australian diplomat. He is serving as Australia's ambassador to Turkey since July 2017.

He is a senior career officer with DFAT and was most recently First Assistant Secretary, Middle East and Africa Division.

In Canberra Innes-Brown has held a range of positions in DFAT, including as Assistant Secretary, Middle East Branch and Assistant Secretary, Iraq Taskforce. He has previously served as Australia's ambassador to Iran and ambassador to Iraq.

Innes-Brown holds a bachelor of economics from the University of Sydney and a master of political science from the University of Hawaii.

References

External links 
 
 

Living people
Year of birth missing (living people)
Australian diplomats
University of Sydney alumni
University of Hawaiʻi at Mānoa alumni